Toosa batesi is a moth in the family Thyrididae. It was described by George Thomas Bethune-Baker in 1927. It is found in Cameroon.

The wingspan is about 40 mm. Both wings are dark lustrous metallic green without any markings.

References

Endemic fauna of Cameroon
Moths described in 1927
Thyrididae